The 2020 Nordic Indoor Athletics Match was the 10th edition of the annual indoor track and field competition for athletes from the Nordic countries, organised by Nordic Athletics. It was held on 9 February at Liikuntamylly in Helsinki, Finland.

Results

Men

Women

References 

Results
 Results
 Kondis.no - God norsk mellom- og langdistanseløping i Nordenkampen

2020
Nordic Indoor Athletics Match
Nordic Indoor Athletics Match
Nordic Indoor Athletics Match
International athletics competitions hosted by Finland
Sports competitions in Helsinki
2020 in Finnish sport